Raghunathan Srianand (born February 1, 1969) is an Indian cosmologist, astrophysicist and a scientist at the Inter-University Centre for Astronomy and Astrophysics (IUCAA). Known for his research on redshift evolution on the cosmic microwave background radiation, Srianand is a member of the International Astronomical Union and the Perimeter Institute for Theoretical Physics.

Focusing his work on observational and theoretical astrophysics, he is known to have assisted in widening the understanding of the bounds on the variation of fundamental constants using the absorption line spectra of quasars. High-z proto-galaxies, time and space variation of fundamental constants, redshift evolution of the CMB temperature and formation and evolution of IGM have been some of the areas of his research. His studies have been documented by way of a number of articles and Google Scholar, an online article repository of scientific articles, has listed 306 of them. The Council of Scientific and Industrial Research, the apex agency of the Government of India for scientific research, awarded him the Shanti Swarup Bhatnagar Prize for Science and Technology, one of the highest Indian science awards, for his contributions to physical sciences in 2008.

Selected bibliography

See also 

 Redshift-space distortions

Notes

References

External links 
 

Recipients of the Shanti Swarup Bhatnagar Award in Physical Science
Academic staff of Savitribai Phule Pune University
Indian scientific authors
1969 births
Living people
Indian astrophysicists
Indian cosmologists
21st-century Indian physicists